Yao Daogang (born 1 September 1997) is a Chinese footballer currently playing as a midfielder or full-back for Hebei.

Club career
Yao Daogang would play for the Wuhan Zall youth team before moving abroad to Portugal where he joined third tier football club Gondomar and would go on to be promoted to their senior team where he made his debut on 11 December 2016 in a league game against F.C. Cesarense in a 1-0 defeat. In the following season he would be loaned out to Chinese club Chongqing Dangdai Lifan on 28 February 2017, however he did not make any appearances for them at all. On his return he would remain with Gondomar for several seasons until he was released by the club and he would return to China where he had a successful trail with top tier club Hebei before officially joining them on 1 March 2021.

Personal life
Yao is the twin brother of fellow footballer Yao Wei.

Career statistics

.

References

External links

1997 births
Living people
Chinese footballers
China youth international footballers
Association football defenders
Campeonato de Portugal (league) players
Wuhan F.C. players
Gondomar S.C. players
Chongqing Liangjiang Athletic F.C. players
Hebei F.C. players
Chinese expatriate footballers
Chinese expatriate sportspeople in Portugal
Expatriate footballers in Portugal